Abortion in Botswana is only legal if the abortion will save the woman's life, if the pregnancy gravely endangers the woman's physical or mental health, or if it is a result of rape or incest. In Botswana, abortions that meet these requirements must be performed within the first 16 weeks of pregnancy in a government hospital and must be approved by two physicians.

Impact of restrictive abortion laws 
Though women in Botswana are recognized as having some of the best access to abortions in Sub-Saharan Africa because of these exceptions, many women are still resorting to unsafe abortions and self-induced abortions, commonly leading to maternal death.

Socio-cultural impacts on abortion 
In Botswana, many families still follow the lobolo custom where men pay a woman's family in order to take her as a bride. This has established an expectation that husbands have paid for and own their wives' bodies, including their reproductive rights. Even though this sentiment may lead to pregnancy that is a result of rape, hospitals and clinics are unlikely to approve marital rape cases as justifying abortion, as cultural norms suggest husbands are entitled to their wives' bodies.

References 

Healthcare in Botswana
Botswana
Botswana